React (2008) is the third collaborative album by electronic musicians Robert Rich and Ian Boddy. Like their previous collaborations Outpost and Lithosphere, this album was released as a limited edition of 2000 copies.

Track listing
”Depth Charge” – 3:54
”Ice Fields” – 7:10
”Sojourn” – 3:32
”AxD” – 7:53
”Veiled” – 4:52
”Slow Hand” – 7:52
”Messages” – 2:16
”Lithosphere” – 6:05
”Blue Moon” – 6:23
”React” – 7:04
”Edge of Nowhere” – 6^33

Total time : 63:55

Personnel
Robert Rich – MOTM modular synthesizer, keyboards, flutes and lap steel guitar
Ian Boddy – Apple MacBook Pro/Ableton Live? sampler & synthesisers

External links
album feature from Robert Rich’s official web site

Robert Rich (musician) albums
2008 live albums
Collaborative albums